Bernard Elmer Daniels (October 31, 1882 – June 6, 1958) was a major league baseball player from 1910 to 1914.

Daniels' first four years were with the New York club in the American League, called the Highlanders through 1912, and the Yankees from 1913 onward. Daniels played well the first three seasons, hitting .253, .286, and .274. However, in 1913 his batting average dropped to .216, and Daniels was traded to the Cincinnati Reds of the National League, where he also hit poorly (.219) during the 1914 season. In 1915, he played for the minor league Baltimore Orioles in the International League, then from 1916 through 1918, he played for the Louisville Colonels in the American Association.

Daniels served as head coach of the Manhattan Jaspers baseball team from 1931 to 1938, amassing a record of 93–38–1.  He ranks fourth all-time in wins on the Jaspers list.

See also
 List of Major League Baseball career stolen bases leaders
 List of Major League Baseball players to hit for the cycle

References

External links

, or Retrosheet

1882 births
1958 deaths
New York Highlanders players
New York Yankees players
Cincinnati Reds players
Major League Baseball outfielders
Baseball players from Illinois
Notre Dame Fighting Irish baseball players
Baltimore Orioles (IL) players
Louisville Colonels (minor league) players
Manhattan Jaspers baseball coaches
Jackson Convicts players